S-14671 is a naphthylpiperazine derivative which acts as a 5-HT1A receptor agonist (pKi = 9.3) with high efficacy and exceptional in vivo potency, and also as a 5-HT2A and 5-HT2C receptor antagonist (both are pKi = 7.8). It displays only low and non-significant affinity for 5-HT1B and 5-HT3 sites.

In producing 5-HT1A-mediated effects such as hypothermia and spontaneous tail flicks in rodents, S-14671 is active at doses as low as 5 µg subcutaneously, and is about 10-fold more potent than 8-OH-DPAT and 100-fold more potent than flesinoxan and buspirone. Other 5-HT1A-mediated effects of S-14671 include induction of flat-body posture, corticosterone secretion, inhibition of morphine-induced antinociception, and attenuation of the electrical activity of the dorsal raphe nucleus.

S-14671 has been found to possess powerful efficacy in the rodent forced swim test and in the pigeon conflict test, indicating marked antidepressant and anxiolytic effects, respectively, of which are also 5-HT1A-mediated. It has never been trialed in humans, perhaps due to its potency being too great.

See also
 CSP-2503
 Naphthylpiperazine

References

Carboxamides
Naphthol ethers
Naphthylpiperazines
Thiophenes
Phenol ethers